Bruno Saetti (1902-1984) was an Italian painter.

References

1902 births
1984 deaths
Painters from Bologna
20th-century Italian painters